The Cazeneuve government (French: Gouvernement Bernard Cazeneuve) was the thirty-ninth government in the Fifth Republic of France. It was led by Bernard Cazeneuve who was appointed Prime Minister of France on 6 December 2016. It consisted of 15 ministers from the Socialist Party (PS), two from the Radical Party of the Left (PRG) and one from Ecologist Party (PE).

Ahead of 2017 presidential election, incumbent President François Hollande announced he would not run for a second presidential term after which incumbent Prime Minister Manuel Valls announced his candidacy at the 2017 Socialist Party presidential primary election and resignation from the position of the Prime Minister the following day. Bernard Cazeneuve, who served as Minister of the Interior under Valls, was appointed head of a new government which resumed almost entirely the composition of the preceding one.

Members

Prime Minister

Ministers

Secretaries of State

Changes
The following changes were made to the Cazeneuve government:
On 27 February 2017, Axelle Lemaire resigned from her post of Secretary of State for Digital Affairs and Innovation to devote time to the presidential campaign of Benoît Hamon and her candidacy in the upcoming legislative election. The post of Secretary of State for Digital Affairs and Innovation was taken over by Christophe Sirugue.
On 21 March 2017, Bruno Le Roux resigned from his post of Minister of the Interior, after accusations of alleged fictitious parliamentary assistant jobs held by his minor daughters while he was a member of the National Assembly. He was replaced by the Secretary of State for Foreign Trade, Tourism and French citizens abroad Matthias Fekl. The post of Secretary of State for Foreign Trade, Tourism and French citizens abroad was abolished.

References

French governments
2016 establishments in France
Cabinets established in 2016
François Hollande
2017 disestablishments in France
Cabinets disestablished in 2017